Frank Cleary Hanighen (1899 – January 10, 1964) was an American journalist.

Biography
Frank Hanighen graduated from Harvard College. He worked as a foreign correspondent in Europe for The New York Post and The Philadelphia Record. He then worked as a Washington, D.C. correspondent for Common Sense. He later worked as an editorial assistant for Dodd, Mead and Company. He also wrote a column for The Freeman.

In 1944, he was a founding editor of Human Events, together with Felix Morley and William Henry Chamberlin.

He was involved in America First Committee, favoring isolationism during World War II.

Bibliography
Merchants of Death (1934, together with H. C. Engelbrecht)
The Secret War (1934)
Santa Anna, the Napoleon of the West (1934)
Nothing But Danger (1939, editor)

References

1899 births
1964 deaths
American male journalists
20th-century American journalists
Writers from Omaha, Nebraska
Human Events people
American anti-war activists
Harvard College alumni
Old Right (United States)